Falling Skies was renewed for a fourth season, which aired from June 22 to August 31, 2014. The season consists of twelve episodes instead of the usual ten. On July 18, 2014, TNT renewed the show for a fifth and final season.

Cast and characters

Main
 Noah Wyle as Tom Mason
 Moon Bloodgood as Anne Glass
 Drew Roy as Hal Mason
 Connor Jessup as Ben Mason
 Maxim Knight as Matt Mason
 Colin Cunningham as John Pope
 Sarah Sanguin Carter as Maggie
 Mpho Koaho as Anthony
 Doug Jones as Cochise
 Seychelle Gabriel as Lourdes
 Scarlett Byrne as Alexis "Lexi" Glass-Mason
 Will Patton as Dan Weaver

Recurring
 Jessy Schram as Karen Nadler
 Christie Burke as Elise
 Megan Danso as Deni
 Dakota Daulby as Kent Matthews
 John DeSantis as Shaq
 Treva Etienne as Dingaan Botha
 Robert Sean Leonard as Roger Kadar
 Laci J. Mailey as Jeanne Weaver
 Ryan Robbins as  Tector Murphy
 Desiree Ross as Mira
 Mira Sorvino as Sara
 Mark Gibbon as Scorch
 Robert Clotworthy as The Monk

Episodes

Production

Development
Falling Skies was renewed for a fourth season, which premiered June 22, 2014. The season consists of twelve episodes instead of the usual ten.

Casting
It was reported that Academy Award winning actress Mira Sorvino will appear in a major recurring role as a character named Sara. Sara is described as, "a woman far removed from her former life as a graphic designer who is now dogged by death at every turn, yet she has never felt more alive, free or fearless. A chance encounter with guerrilla fighter John Pope (Colin Cunningham) leads her to join the resistance and develop a strong personal bond with the outlaw-turned-warrior." Harry Potter alum Scarlett Byrne who played Pansy Parkinson was also cast in the role of Alexis "Lexi" Glass-Mason as a new series regular.

Reception

Ratings

References

External links
 

 
 
2014 American television seasons